Zen has a rich doctrinal background, despite the traditional Zen narrative which states that it is a "special transmission outside scriptures" which "did not stand upon words."

Polarities 
Classical Chinese Chán is characterised by a set of polarities: absolute-relative, Buddha-nature - sunyata, sudden and gradual enlightenment, esoteric and exoteric transmission.

Absolute-relative 
The Prajnaparamita-sutras  and Madhyamaka emphasized the non-duality of form and emptiness: "form is emptiness, emptiness is form", as the Heart Sutra says. 
This was understood to mean that ultimate reality is not a transcendental realm, but equal to the daily world of relative reality. This idea fitted into the Chinese culture, which emphasized the mundane world and society. But this does not tell how the absolute is present in the relative world:

This question is answered in such schemata as the Five Ranks of Tozan, the Oxherding Pictures, and Hakuin's Four ways of knowing.

The Madhyamaka-scheme of the Two Truths doctrine, and the Yogacara-schemes of the Three Natures and the Trikaya-doctrine, also give depictions of the interplay between the absolute and the relative.

Buddha-nature and sunyata
When Buddhism was introduced in China it was understood in terms of its own culture. Various sects struggled to attain an understanding of the Indian texts. The Tathāgatagarbha Sutras and the idea of the Buddha-nature were endorsed, because of the perceived similarities with the Tao, which was understood as a transcendental reality underlying the world of appearances. Sunyata at first was understood as pointing to the Taoist "wu", nothingness.

The doctrine of the Buddha-nature asserts that all sentient beings have Buddha-nature (Skt. Buddhadhātu, "Buddha Element", "Buddha-Principle"), the element from which awakening springs. The Tathāgatagarbha Sutras (literally: the womb of the thus-gone) state that every living being has the potential to realize awakening. Hence Buddhism offers salvation to every-one, not only to monks or those who have freed themselves almost completely from karma in previous lives. The  Yogacara theory of the Eight Consciousnesses explains how sensory input and the mind create the world we experience, and obscure the alaya-vijnana, which is equated to the Buddha-nature.

When this potential is realized, and the defilements have been eliminated, the tathagatagarbha manifests as the Dharmakaya, the absolute reality which pervades everything in the world. In this way, it is also the primordial reality from which phenomenal reality springs. When this understanding is idealized, it becomes a transcendental reality beneath the world of appearances.

Sunyata points to the "emptiness" or no-"thing"-ness of all "things". Though we perceive a world of concrete and discrete objects, designated by names, on close analysis the "thingness" dissolves, leaving them "empty" of inherent existence. The Heart sutra, a text from the prajnaparamita-sutras, articulates this in the following saying in which the five skandhas are said to be "empty":

The teachings on the five skandhas belong to the central teachings in the Tripitaka. They form a subdivision of the Samyutta Nikaya. The five skandhas are also mentioned in the Lankavatara-sutra:

The Yogacara explains this "emptiness" in an analysis of the way we perceive "things". Everything we conceive of is the result of the working of the five skandhas—results of perception, feeling, volition, and discrimination. The five skandhas together compose consciousness. The "things" we are conscious of are "mere concepts", not Ding an sich.

It took Chinese Buddhism several centuries to recognize that sunyata does not refer to "wu", nothingness, nor does Buddhism postulate an undying soul. The influence of those various doctrinal and textual backgrounds is still discernible in Zen. Zen teachers still refer to Buddha-nature, but the Zen tradition also emphasizes that Buddha-nature is sunyata, the absence of an independent and substantial self.

Sudden and gradual enlightenment 

In Zen Buddhism two main views on the way to enlightenment are discernible, namely sudden and gradual enlightenment.

Early Chán recognized the "transcendence of the body and mind", followed by "non-defilement [of] knowledge and perception", meaning sudden insight into the true nature followed by gradual purification of intentions.

In the 8th-century the Ch'an-history was effectively re-fashioned by Shenhui, who created a dichotomy between the so-called "Northern School", led by Yuquan Shenxiu, and his own line of teaching, which he called the "Southern school". Shenhui placed Hui-neng into prominence as the sixth Chán-patriarch, and emphasized sudden enlightenment, as opposed to the concurrent Northern School's alleged gradual enlightenment. According to the sudden enlightenment propagated by Shenhui insight into true nature is sudden; thereafter there can be no misunderstanding anymore about this true nature.

In the Platform Sutra the dichotomy between sudden and gradual is reconciled. Guifeng Zongmi, fifth-generation successor to Shenhui, also softened the edge between sudden and gradual. In his analysis, sudden awakening points to seeing into one's true nature, but is to be followed by a gradual cultivation to attain Buddhahood.

Chinul, a 12th-century Korean Seon master, followed Zongmi, and also emphasized that insight into our true nature is sudden, but is to be followed by practice to ripen the insight and attain full Buddhahood. This is also the standpoint of the contemporary Sanbo Kyodan, according to whom kensho is at the start of the path to full  enlightenment.

This gradual cultivation is also recognized by Tozan, who described the Five ranks of enlightenment. Other example of depiction of stages on the path are the Ten Ox-Herding Pictures which detail the steps on the Path, The Three mysterious Gates of Linji, and the Four Ways of Knowing of Hakuin. This gradual cultivation is described by Chan Master Sheng Yen as follows:

The emphasis which Shenhui placed on sudden enlightenment, also reflected a growing appreciation of the Diamond Sutra in 8th-century Chinese Buddhism. The Lankavatara-sutra, which endorses the Buddha-nature, emphasized purity of mind, which can be attained in gradations. The Diamond-sutra emphasizes sunyata, which "must be realized  totally or not at all".

Once the dichotomy between sudden and gradual was in place, it defined its own logic and rhetorics, which are also recognizable in the distinction between Caodong (Soto) and Lin-ji (Rinzai) chán. But it also leads to a "sometimes bitter and always prolix sectarian controversy between later Chán and Hua-yen exegetes". In the Huayan classification of teachings, the sudden approach was regarded inferior to the Perfect Teaching of Hua-yen. Guifeng Zongmi, fifth patriarch of Hua-yen ànd Chán-master, devised his own classification to counter this subordination. To establish the superiority of the Chán-teachings, Chinul explained the sudden approach as not pointing to mere emptiness, but to suchness or the dharmadhatu.

Esoteric and exoteric transmission 
According to Borup the emphasis on 'mind to mind transmission' is a form of esoteric transmission, in which "the tradition and the enlightened mind is transmitted face to face". Metaphorically this can be described as the transmission from a flame from one candle to another candle, or the transmission from one vein to another. In exoteric transmission requires "direct access to the teaching through a personal discovery of one's self. This type of transmission and identification is symbolized by the discovery of a shining lantern, or a mirror."

This polarity is recognizable in the emphasis that the Zen-tradition puts on maintaining the correct Dharma transmission, while simultaneously stressing seeing into one's nature. According to Rinzai master Tōrei Enji:

Nevertheless, while the Zen tradition has always stressed the importance of formal Dharma transmission, there are well known examples of Mushi dokugo, such as Nōnin, Jinul and Suzuki Shōsan who attained awakening on their own, though all of them were familiair with the Zen-teachings.

The Bodhisattva ideal 

An important, though easily overlooked aspect of Zen is the bodhisattva ideal. It supplements kensho and insight into the absolute with Karuṇā, compassion with all sentient beings. This ideal is reflected in the Bodhisattva vow and the Bodhisattva Precepts or jukai.

Part of this Bodhisattva-ideal are the pāramitās, which are also being mentioned in the Diamond Sutra: 
 Dāna (generosity, giving of oneself),
 Śīla (virtue, morality, proper conduct),
 Kṣānti (patience, tolerance, forbearance, acceptance, endurance),
 Vīrya (energy, diligence, vigour, effort),
 Dhyāna (meditation, tranquility), and
 Prajñā (wisdom, insight).

The Bodhisattva-ideal is a central theme in the prajnaparamita-sutras.

Dogen mentions the Bodhisattva-ideal throughout his works.

Hakuin saw "deep compassion and commitment to help all sentient beings everywhere" as an indispensable part of the Buddhist path to awakening. Hakuin emphasized the need of "post-satori training", purifying the mind of karmic tendencies and 

The insight in the need of arousing bodhicitta formed Hakuin's final awakening:

Buddhas and bodhisattvas such as Amitābha, Avalokiteśvara, Mañjuśrī, Samantabhadra, and Kṣitigarbha are venerated alongside Gautama Buddha.

The ultimate goal is given in the end of the sutra, which states, "In the morning, be one with Avalokiteshvara; in the evening, be one with Avalokiteshvara". Through the realization of emptiness and the Mahayana notion that all things have Buddha-nature, one understands that there is no difference between the cosmic bodhisattva and oneself. The wisdom and compassion of the Bodhisattva one is chanting to is seen to equal the inner wisdom and compassion of the practitioner. Thus, the duality between subject and object, practitioner and Bodhisattva, chanter and sutra is ended.

See also 
 Buddhism
 Outline of Buddhism
 Timeline of Buddhism
 List of Buddhists
 Chinese Buddhism
 Japanese Zen

Notes

References

Written references

Web references

Sources 

 
 
 
 
 
 
 {{Citation | last =Buswell | first =Robert E. | year =1991 | title =The "Short-cut" Approach of K'an-hua Meditation: The Evolution of a Practical Subitism in Chinese Ch'an Buddhism. In: Peter N. Gregory (editor) (1991), Sudden and Gradual. Approaches to Enlightenment in Chinese Thought | place =Delhi | publisher =Motilal Banarsidass Publishers Private Limited}}
 
 
 
 
 
 
 
 
 
 
 
 
 
 
 
 
 
 
 
 
 
 
 
 
 
 
 
 
 
 
 
 
 
 
 
 
 
 
 
 
 
 

 
 
 
 
 
 
 
 
 

Further reading
Modern classics
 Paul Reps & Nyogen Senzaki, Zen Flesh, Zen Bones Philip Kapleau, The Three Pillars of Zen Shunryu Suzuki, Zen Mind, Beginner's MindClassic history
 Dumoulin, Heinrich (2005), Zen Buddhism: A History. Volume 1: India and China. World Wisdom Books. 
 Dumoulin, Heinrich (2005), Zen Buddhism: A History. Volume 2: Japan. World Wisdom Books. 

Critical Zen-studies
 Mcrae, John (2003), Seeing through Zen. Encounter, Transformation, and Genealogy in Chinese Chan Buddhism''. The University Press Group Ltd.

External links 

Oversight
 Zen Buddhism WWW Virtual Library
 The Zen Site

Texts
 Sacred-text.com's collection of Zen texts
 Buddhanet's collection of Zen texts
 Shambhala Sun Zen Articles 
 Booklets from Fo Guang Shan

History
 Buddhism and Confucianism in Chan Sudden Approach: A Cunning Cultural Paradigm
 History of Zen Buddhism
 Zen history
 Zen Quick Facts

Critical Chán Research
 Steven Heine (2007), A Critical Survey of Works on Zen since Yampolsky
 Homepage of Robert H. Sharf

Zen